Natalija Kočergina (born 17 April 1985) is Lithuanian biathlete and cross-country skier.

She finished 91st (individual) and 98th (sprint) in the 2011 World Biathlon Championships. In 2012, she was 72nd in individual and 89th in sprint. During the 2013 World championships she did not finish in the individual event and placed 99th in sprint.

In 2013, she participated in the FIS Nordic World Ski Championships, where she finished 54th in the Women's 10 km freestyle and 20th in the team sprint. 

In 2014, she became Lithuanian champion in biathlon for the first time.

Biathlon results
All results are sourced from the International Biathlon Union.

World Championships
0 medals

*During Olympic seasons competitions are only held for those events not included in the Olympic program.
**The single mixed relay was added as an event in 2019.

References
Kočergina IBU profile

1985 births
Living people
Lithuanian female biathletes
Lithuanian female cross-country skiers
Olympic biathletes of Lithuania
Biathletes at the 2018 Winter Olympics